Coast to Coast is the fourth US studio album by the English rock band the Dave Clark Five. It is notable for containing two hit singles "Any Way You Want It" and "Everybody Knows (I Still Love You)". Other songs from this album were used in the Dave Clark Five film Having a Wild Weekend such as "I Can't Stand It" and "When". In Canada, it was released as Across Canada with the Dave Clark Five on Capitol Records.

Reception

In his retrospective review for Allmusic, critic Bruce Eder wrote, "Coast To Coast opens strong and it gets better, blooming into an amazingly diverse yet consistently powerful record made up entirely of group originals... Had there been an actual rock press in 1964, or if the Dave Clark Five been taken more seriously sooner, Coast To Coast would probably be regarded today as something close to an essential British Invasion record..."

Cash Box said of the single "Everybody Knows (I Still Love You)" that it has "an interesting cool quality and a good dance rhythm" and it "can't miss."

Track listing

Side one
"Any Way You Want It" (Ron Ryan) – 2:26
"Give Me Love" (Also titled as "I Can't Stop Loving You") (Dave Clark, Denny Payton) – 1:55
"I Can't Stand It" (Dave Clark, Lenny Davidson) – 1:31
"I'm Left Without You" (Also titled as "What Is There To Say") (Dave Clark, Denny Payton) – 1:45
"Everybody Knows (I Still Love You)" (Dave Clark, Lenny Davidson) – 1:39
"Crying Over You" (Dave Clark, Lenny Davidson) – 2:04

Side two
"Say You Want Me" (Dave Clark, Lenny Davidson) – 1:42
"When" (Dave Clark, Lenny Davidson) – 2:23
"Don't You Know" (Dave Clark, Denny Payton) – 1:33
"To Me" (Dave Clark, Denny Payton) – 1:39
"It's Not True" (Dave Clark, Mike Smith) – 1:59

Personnel

Dave Clark Five
Dave Clark - drums, backing vocals
Mike Smith - keyboards, lead vocals
Lenny Davidson - guitars, backing and harmony vocals
Rick Huxley - bass guitar, backing vocals
Denis Payton - saxophone,  backing vocals

References

The Dave Clark Five albums
1965 albums
Epic Records albums